Denmark–United Arab Emirates relations refers to the bilateral relations established between Denmark and the United Arab Emirates. The UAE does not have a diplomatic mission in Denmark although Denmark maintains a consulate in Dubai and also announced the reopening of an embassy in Abu Dhabi in 2010, more than a decade after it was closed because of budget cuts.

Expatriate community
There is also a small expatriate community of Danes in the United Arab Emirates. As of 2010, their number was around 2,000, up from just 400 since 2005.

Diplomatic relations

Reaction to the Jyllands-Posten Muhammad cartoons controversy
Relations between the two were strained following the Jyllands-Posten Muhammad cartoons controversy. Summoning non-resident Danish ambassador to UAE Hans Klingenberg to his office in 2008, UAE Foreign Affairs Minister Anwar Mohammed Qarqash remarked that the UAE was "keen to bolster and sustain relations with many countries worldwide, including the kingdom of Denmark" but reiterated the stance of the UAE "on non-mixing up the Press freedom and ridiculing Islam". He added that the event had cast a shadow on the bilateral relations, noting that the Danish government could do more to stop the defamation of Islam and that the UAE would remain "vocal and tolerant, and build foreign relations," but would "not tolerate attacks on its Islamic heritage."

See also 
 Foreign relations of Denmark 
 Foreign relations of the United Arab Emirates

References

External links
 Danes in Dubai - Official homepage
 Danish Consulate General in Dubai

 
United Arab Emirates
Bilateral relations of the United Arab Emirates